The Mausoleum of the Atilii (Spanish: Mausoleo de los Atilios or El altar de los moros, meaning "Altar of the Moors") is a Roman mausoleum dating from 2nd or 3rd centuries AD, located in the municipal territory of Sádaba, Aragon, eastern Spain.

Nearby in the territory of Uncastillo, is a Roman villa. The mausoleum was located aside the Roman road connecting Zaragoza to Pamplona and Astorga. Only a wall, built in sandstone, has survived today. It bears the following inscriptions:

External links
Gran Enciclopedia Aragonesa website: Mausoleum of the Atilii

Atilii
Buildings and structures in the Province of Zaragoza
History of Aragon
Buildings and structures completed in the 2nd century
2nd-century establishments in the Roman Empire
Bien de Interés Cultural landmarks in the Province of Zaragoza